William Larsen Jr. (May 8, 1928 – February 11, 1993) was co-founder and president of the Academy of Magical Arts, better known as Hollywood’s Magic Castle, with his brother Milt Larsen and wife Irene Larsen. Born in Pasadena and a graduate of Occidental College, Larsen began his career in television at CBS, working his way up to associate producer of “Playhouse 90" and the Danny Kaye and Jonathan Winters variety shows. In 1953, after the death of his father, attorney and magician William W. Larsen Sr., he became editor and eventually publisher of Genii, The Conjurors Magazine, a publication for magicians founded by his parents in 1936. Larsen and his brother, Milt Larsen, realizing a dream of their father’s, founded the Magic Castle in 1963, a private dining and performance club for magicians that now has more than 5,000 members. Not long after the Magic Castle opened, Bill married Irene Larsen on November 10, 1963. Along with Milt Larsen, he has a star on the Hollywood Walk of Fame. 

On February 12, 1993, the Los Angeles Times published his obituary.

References

American magicians
1928 births
1993 deaths